Hand Over Your Loved Ones (re-released as Suck Fony) is the second studio album released by American rock band Wheatus.

Background
Hand Over Your Loved Ones, according to frontman Brendan B. Brown, is "a really glossy pop record that had a lot of radio friendly singles on it."

Release
The album was released on 8 September 2003 by Columbia Records. Due to conflicts between the band and their record label, the album was poorly promoted, failed to sell well and only one single, "American In Amsterdam", was released from it. Free from their contract with Sony, Wheatus released five songs from the album on iTunes as The Lemonade EP in 2004.

The album was re-released on 14 February 2005 under the name Suck Fony, on the band's own record label Montauk Mantis Productions, after they decided to leave Sony BMG. The re-released version includes two new tracks, including the original composition "William McGovern", and the Pat Benatar cover "Hit Me with Your Best Shot". The album is currently available directly from the band's official website for $10, and is available to download in various formats using a 'pay what you want' donation system where the customer can donate any amount to purchase the album. The album's title is a spoonerism of the phrase "Fuck Sony". A T-shirt was available for a period of time from the band's website with the album logo on the front.

Track listing

Hand Over Your Loved Ones
 "American in Amsterdam" – 3:58
 "The Song That I Wrote When You Dissed Me" – 4:04
 "Anyway" – 4:09
 "Freak On" – 4:44
 "Lemonade" – 3:22
 "The Deck" – 2:38
 "Fair Weather Friend" – 3:25
 "Randall" – 4:18
 "Whole Amoeba" – 3:07
 "Dynomite Satchel of Pain" – 14:57

Suck Fony
 "The Deck" – 2:37
 "Lemonade" – 3:23
 "Hit Me with Your Best Shot" – 3:22
 "Anyway" – 4:08
 "Freak On" – 4:44
 "William McGovern" – 3:48
 "American in Amsterdam" – 3:57
 "Fair Weather Friend" – 3:25
 "Randall" – 4:18
 "Whole Amoeba" – 3:08
 "The Song That I Wrote When You Dissed Me" – 4:02
 "Dynomite Satchel of Pain" – 4:17

 Hidden tracks
 13. "The Song That I Wrote When You Dissed Me" (Demo #1) – 3:21
 14. "The Song That I Wrote When You Dissed Me" (Demo #2) – 3:45

Personnel
Band
 Brendan B. Brown – lead vocals, guitar, samples, tambourines, shakers
 Peter Brown – drums, backing vocals, turntables
 Mike McCabe – bass guitar, backing vocals
 Shannon Harris – Rhodes piano, clavinet, piano, Hammond organ, tambourines

Other
 Liz Brown – backing vocals
 Kathryn Froggatt – backing vocals
 Philip A. Jimenez – banjo, turntables
 David Froggatt – whistling, kookaburra
 Rakiem Walker – saxophone
 Gerald Thomas – baritone sax
 Michael Lewis – trumpet
 Benjamin Morss – Rhodes piano
 Bendji – timbales

References

External links

Hand Over Your Loved Ones at YouTube (streamed copy where licensed)

Wheatus albums
2003 albums
Columbia Records albums
Pop albums by American artists